Colette Fitzpatrick (born June 1974) is one of the main news anchors at Virgin Media News (formerly known as "TV3 News"), since September 2006. She is a native of Holycross, Thurles, County Tipperary.
 
Fitzpatrick is a Virgin Media News anchor. She presents the weekday bulletins: News at 12.30 and News at 5.30. She has also hosted the prime time current affairs show Midweek.

Fitzpatrick began working in the TV3 newsroom in March 2001. She has edited and anchored bulletins for the morning news programme Ireland AM and also reported on a range issues for the main evening news. She reported from Kashmir on the aftermath of the earthquake. She was also a regular stand-in as main presenter on Ireland AM alongside Mark Cagney, Alan Hughes and Aidan Cooney.

Fizpatrick previously worked in the newsroom in Today FM where she edited and presented hourly bulletins and reported on a range of stories including courts and tribunals. She produced The Sunday Supplement, presented by Sam Smyth, and also previously worked at East Coast FM in County Wicklow where she first began her broadcasting career. Colette graduated in Journalism from DIT in Aungier Street.

Fitzpatrick is married to studio director Niall McDermot. In June 2010, Fitzpatrick confirmed that she was expecting her first child, due in November. Son Milo was born on 18 November 2010, but it was a nightmare birth as chronicled by Fitzpatrick herself.

References

1974 births
20th-century Irish people
21st-century Irish people
Alumni of Dublin Institute of Technology
East Coast FM presenters
Irish women radio presenters
Living people
People from Thurles
Today FM presenters
Virgin Media News newsreaders and journalists